This is a list of countries and territories and organisations where Romanian is an official language:

Countries where Romanian is an official language

Regions where Romanian is an official language 

Romanian has been declared a "regional language" alongside Ukrainian in Hertsa Raion of Ukraine as well as in other villages of Chernivtsi and Zakarpattia oblasts, as per the 2012 legislation on languages in Ukraine.

Organisations with Romanian as an official language

Countries where Romanian is taught in schools 
  Romanian language is taught in 13 schools in the Belgian cities of: Brussels, Liège and Mons.
  Romanian language is taught in two schools in the Irish capital Dublin.
  Romanian language is taught in 228 schools in the Italian regions of: Abruzzo, Apulia, Emilia-Romagna, Campania, Friuli-Venezia Giulia, Lazio, Lombardy, Marche, Molise, Piedmont, Sardinia, Sicily, Trento, Tuscany, Umbria and Veneto.
  Romanian language is taught in five schools in the Portuguese cities of: Lisbon, Loulé and Setúbal.
  Romanian language is taught in 328 schools in the Spanish communities of: Andalusia, Aragon, Asturias, Basque Country, Canary Islands, Cantabria, Castile and León, Castilla-La Mancha, Catalonia, La Rioja, Madrid, Murcia, Navarre and Valencia.
  In parts of Ukraine where Romanians constitute a significant share of the local population (districts in Chernivtsi, Odessa and Zakarpattia oblasts) Romanian is taught in schools as a primary language and there are Romanian-language newspapers, TV, and radio broadcasting. The University of Chernivtsi trains teachers for Romanian schools in the fields of Romanian philology, mathematics and physics.

See also 
 Language geography
 Geolinguistics

References 

Romania-related lists